Prelesje is the name of several settlements in Slovenia:

Prelesje, Črnomelj, a settlement in the Municipality of Črnomelj
Prelesje, Gorenja Vas–Poljane, a settlement in the Municipality of Gorenja Vas–Poljane
Prelesje, Litija, a settlement in the Municipality of Litija
Prelesje, Šentrupert, a settlement in the Municipality of Šentrupert